Louis Paul Gregory (July 10, 1902 – April 21, 1989) was an American long-distance runner. He competed in the men's 10,000 metres at the 1932 Summer Olympics.

References

External links
 

1902 births
1989 deaths
Athletes (track and field) at the 1932 Summer Olympics
American male long-distance runners
Olympic track and field athletes of the United States
Place of birth missing
20th-century American people